Ksenia Smetanenko, married name: Gonchar (born 26 March 1979) is a former ice dancer who competed internationally for Russia and Armenia. With Samuel Gezalian, she is the 1997 Golden Spin of Zagreb champion and competed at the 1998 Winter Olympics for Armenia. Earlier in her career, she competed for Russia with Igor Lukanin.

Career 
Smetanenko originally competed for Russia. With Igor Lukanin, she placed third at the 1992 Russian National Junior Championships and tenth at the 1993 World Junior Championships for Russia. They also appeared twice at the German Championships.

In 1997, Smetanenko teamed up with Samuel Gezalian and began representing Armenia. Placing sixth at the 1997 Karl Schäfer Memorial, they qualified a spot for Armenia at the Olympics. Smetanenko/Gezalian then won gold at the 1997 Golden Spin of Zagreb and placed 20th at the 1998 European Championships before competing at the 1998 Winter Olympics in Nagano, where they placed 24th. They retired from competition at the end of the season.

Personal life 
Smetanenko was born in Moscow. She married former professional hockey player Sergei Gonchar now assistant coach with the Pittsburgh Penguins, whom she met at the 1998 Winter Olympics. They have two daughters, Natalie and Victoria.

Competitive highlights

With Gezalian for Armenia

With Lukanin for Russia and Germany

References

 Skatabase: 1990s Olympics
 Skatabase: 1990s Europeans
 1997 Golden Spin of Zagreb
 1997 German Championships
 1996 German Championships

1979 births
Russian female ice dancers
Armenian female ice dancers
Olympic figure skaters of Armenia
Figure skaters at the 1998 Winter Olympics
Living people
Figure skaters from Moscow